The Stanislav phenomenon was a group of writers in the 2000s who defined themselves according to the name of their city: Stanislawow in Polish, Stanislou in German, and Stanislaviv in Ukrainian. The term denotes the artists and writers living in Ivano-Frankivsk who were affiliated with the Western postmodernism after the collapse of the Soviet Union. The writers include Yuri Andrukhovych, Halyna Petrosanyak, Yuri Izdryk, Volodymyr Yeshkiliev, and Taras Prokhasko.

References 

Postmodern literature
Counterculture of the 1990s